Vladimir Trofimenko (22 March 1953 in Syzran — 1994) was a pole vaulter who represented the USSR. He won the 1978 European Championships in Athletics as well as two medals at the European Indoor Championships.

In 1978 he vaulted 5.61 m and break the Soviet national outdoor pole vault record.

He was married Yolanda Chen.

Achievements

References

1953 births
Soviet male pole vaulters
Russian male pole vaulters
European Athletics Championships medalists
Universiade medalists in athletics (track and field)
People from Syzran
1994 deaths
Universiade bronze medalists for the Soviet Union
Medalists at the 1977 Summer Universiade
Sportspeople from Samara Oblast